KTorrent is a BitTorrent client that is part of the KDE Gear.

Features 
KTorrent is often received as a client intended to be feature rich. Features include:
Upload and download speed capping / throttling & scheduling
Internet searching with torrent search engines using KHTML part.
Support for UDP trackers.
IP address blocklist plugin
Port forwarding with UPnP (Universal Plug and Play)
Protocol encryption
DHT (mainline version), and support for trackerless torrents
μTorrent peer exchange (PEX) support
File Prioritization
Ability to import partially downloaded files
Directory scanner to automatically watch directories for new torrents
Manual addition of trackers to torrents
RSS feed support
Web interface plugin with default port number 8080
IPv6 support
SOCKS v4 and v5 support
μTP support
Generation and parsing of magnet links
UDP tracker scraping
Enhanced usability of the queue manager
Super-seeding support
Streaming of video while downloading

See also 

 KGet
 qBittorrent
 Comparison of BitTorrent software

References

External links 

 
 KTorrent's KDE Extragear page
 Bright Hub Multi-part article about Ktorrent

BitTorrent clients for Linux
Extragear
File sharing software that uses Qt
Free BitTorrent clients
KDE Applications
MacOS file sharing software